Massachusetts House of Representatives' 5th Suffolk district in the United States is one of 160 legislative districts included in the lower house of the Massachusetts General Court. It covers part of the city of Boston in Suffolk County. Democrat Christopher Worrell of Dorchester has represented the district since 2023.

The current district geographic boundary overlaps with those of the Massachusetts Senate's 1st Suffolk and 2nd Suffolk districts.

Representatives
 Edward Sands, circa 1858-1859 
 Abraham G. Wyman, circa 1858 
 Frederick Whiton, circa 1859 
 Patrick J. Calnan, circa 1888 
 Edward Gagan, circa 1888 
 John I. Fitzgerald, circa 1920 
 Louis Orenberg, circa 1920 
 Edward A. Scigliano, circa 1920 
 Christian Herter, circa 1939
 Henry Lee Shattuck, circa 1945
 James C. Bayley, circa 1951 
 Sherman Miles, 1947–1953 
 John Yerxa, 1953–1957
 William Bulger, circa 1967
 Barney Frank, circa 1975 
 Richard J. Rouse
 Nelson Merced, 1989-1993
 Althea Garrison, 1993-1995
 Charlotte Golar Richie, 1995-1999
 Marie St. Fleur, 1999-2011
 Carlos Henriquez, 2011-2014
 Evandro Carvalho, 2014-2019
 Liz Miranda, 2019-2023
 Christopher Worrell, 2023-current

See also
 List of Massachusetts House of Representatives elections
 Other Suffolk County districts of the Massachusetts House of Representatives: 1st, 2nd, 3rd, 4th, 6th, 7th, 8th, 9th, 10th, 11th, 12th, 13th, 14th, 15th, 16th, 17th, 18th, 19th
 List of Massachusetts General Courts
 List of former districts of the Massachusetts House of Representatives

Images
Portraits of legislators

References

External links
 Ballotpedia
  (State House district information based on U.S. Census Bureau's American Community Survey).
 League of Women Voters of Boston

House
Government of Suffolk County, Massachusetts